Sylvia Blankenship (née Meadows) (born September 10, 1954) is an American horticulturalist and inventor. She is an emeritus professor at North Carolina State University. She identified 1-methylcyclopropene, a compound which extends the storage life of fruits. Blakenship was inducted into the National Inventors Hall of Fame in 2020.

Early life and education 
Blankenship grew up in Northern Virginia and spent her summers on a ranch in Texas. She was interested in nature as a child, and enjoyed adventure stories about Davy Crockett. She began her studies at Texas A&M University, where she became interested in plant sciences and first started to explore plant compounds. She moved to Oregon State University for her doctoral research, where she earned a PhD in 1983. Her doctoral research looked at the biosynthesis of ethylene in pears during ripening.

Research and career 
Blankenship was appointed to the faculty of the North Carolina State University and remained there throughout her career, eventually becoming an emeritus professor.

Blankenship studied ethylene binding sites and the identification of ethylene inhibitors. She did not receive much research funding, but, in collaboration with Edward Sisler, managed to develop the compound 1-Methylcyclopropene (1-MCP). 1-MCP docks in the plant receptor sites that typically accommodate ethylene. By binding 1-MCP instead of ethylene, produce and flowers remain fresher for longer. She tested her compound on carnations, apples and tomatoes. 1-MCP was patented in 1996 and licensed to Floralife, who incorporated 1-MCP into a white powder that was easy to use. Eventually it was licensed to SmartFresh, which earned North Carolina State University over $25 million in royalties.

In 2020, Blankenship was inducted into the National Inventors Hall of Fame.

Awards and honors 
 2007 American Society for Horticultural Science Outstanding Researcher
 2010 Fellow of the International Society for Horticultural Science
 2015 North Carolina State University Innovator of the Year
 2020 Inducted into the National Inventors Hall of Fame

Selected publications

References 

1954 births
Living people
American horticulturists
Women horticulturists and gardeners
20th-century American inventors
Women inventors
Scientists from Virginia
Texas A&M University alumni
Oregon State University alumni
North Carolina State University faculty
20th-century American scientists
20th-century American women scientists
21st-century American scientists
21st-century American women scientists